ORCON or Orcon may refer to:

 Orcon Internet Limited, a New Zealand internet service provider
 ORCON, a U.S. intelligence code word used to mark information as "originator controlled"
 Operational Research CONsultancy (ORCON), a UK government initiative to improve ambulance response times
 Project Pigeon, later Project Orcon, a World War II project to use pigeons to control guided missiles